is a Japanese politician and a member of the House of Representatives in the Diet (national legislature). A native of Ōmihachiman, Shiga and graduate of Kyoto University, he was elected to the House of Representatives for the first time in 2000. He was the Minister of Environment and Minister of State for Nuclear Power Policy and Administration in the cabinet of Yoshihiko Noda.  He represents the 5th District of Shizuoka prefecture.

Goshi Hosono considered running in the September 2012 Democratic Party (DPJ) presidential elections against incumbent Yoshihiko Noda, but was eventually dissuaded from doing so by senior members of the party.

Goshi Hosono was a protégé of DPJ Secretary General Azuma Koshiishi, who saw him as a potential future Prime Minister.

After Noda's re-election as party president, and re-appointment of Koshiishi as Secretary General of the DPJ, Noda persuaded Hosono to become chairman of the party Policy Research Committee. The appointment of the popular 41-year-old Hosono was seen as important in preparing for the upcoming general election.

After the DPJ's loss in the December 2012 election, the party went into opposition. Hosono was cited as a possible successor to the party's leader Banri Kaieda. After Kaieda was defeated in the 2014 election, Hosono ran for the DPJ leadership, but was defeated by former party president Katsuya Okada.

In August 2017, Hosono left the Democratic Party, the successor of the DPJ, with the intention to form his own political party. His reason for wanting to leave the party was because of its policy on security and amending the Constitution. In September, he collaborated with Tokyo governor Yuriko Koike and Diet member Masaru Wakasa to form a conservative opposition party named the Party of Hope. After the then-DP leader Seiji Maehara allowed party members to run under the Hope banner in the imminent general election, conservative-leaning DP representatives moved to Hope en masse. However, a significant bloc of ex-DP representatives were barred from running under the Hope ticket by then-party leader Koike. Several of these representatives then formed the Constitutional Democratic Party (CDP) to house liberal-leaning former DP members. Some chose to run as independents, including Yoshihiko Noda and Katsuya Okada.

Despite appearing at the start of the campaign to be able to deprive Prime Minister Shinzo Abe of his majority, campaign blunders by Koike led the party to fall short of initial expectations. Hope lost seats and only became the second largest opposition party behind the CDP, which ran a relatively successful campaign despite being hastily established.

When Hope merged with the Democratic Party in May 2018 to form the Democratic Party for the People, Hosono decided to not join the new party and became an independent member instead. Hosono later joined the Nikai faction of the LDP in January 2019 while remaining as an independent.

References

External links
Official website (Japanese)

Members of the House of Representatives (Japan)
Kyoto University alumni
People from Shiga Prefecture
1971 births
Living people
Democratic Party of Japan politicians
Environment ministers of Japan
Noda cabinet
21st-century Japanese politicians